Bohuslav Braum (born 22 February 1956) is a Czech weightlifter. He competed in the men's super heavyweight event at the 1980 Summer Olympics.

References

External links
 

1956 births
Living people
Czech male weightlifters
Olympic weightlifters of Czechoslovakia
Weightlifters at the 1980 Summer Olympics
Sportspeople from Prague
World Weightlifting Championships medalists